Black Hammer is an ongoing American comic series created by writer Jeff Lemire and artist Dean Ormston, published by Dark Horse Comics.

Plot
Ten years ago, Black Hammer and six other superheroes saved Spiral City from the Anti-God, but in the process became trapped in Rockwood, a timeless Twilight Zone-ish town. Shortly after the heroes arrived, Black Hammer died while trying to escape. In the present, the six heroes live on Black Hammer farm with very little hope of ever escaping Rockwood.

Publication history

Phase I
Jeff Lemire originally conceived of Black Hammer in 2007, intending to draw the story himself after the end of Essex County. In 2008, he pitched the series to Dark Horse editor Diana Schutz. The pitch was accepted, but Lemire was unable to begin work until he finished The Nobody and Sweet Tooth for Vertigo, then his exclusivity contract for DC Comics prevented him from working on the series from 2010 to 2014. When Lemire returned to the series in 2014, he was working on so many projects that drawing it himself was no longer possible, so he teamed up with artist Dean Ormston for the title. According to Lemire, it was important for Black Hammer to not to look anything like mainstream superhero comics. He wanted the series to stand outside of superhero comics and comment on them, not become one of them. For this, Ormston's art style was deemed perfect.

Black Hammer #1 was originally scheduled for release March 2015, but Ormston suffered a cerebral hemorrhage, which left the right side of his body partially paralyzed. After months of rehabilitation, Ormston recovered. The first issue of Black Hammer came out July the following year. Lemire continued working on the series while Ormston recovered. Dean Ormston's working pace was greatly reduced, so he sometimes worked with layout assistance from Peter Gross. Because of this, Lemire has scripts written well ahead of the release schedule.

In 2017, Jeff Lemire started to expand the Black Hammer universe with spinoff titles, starting with Sherlock Frankenstein and the Legion of Evil. The spinoffs are identified by a "From the world of Black Hammer" banner along the top of the cover. Early on, Black Hammer and its spinoffs were frequently referred to as "The Hammerverse" (not to be confused with David Drake's Hammerverse) by editor Daniel Chabon in the letter columns, though the official branding is now "The World of Black Hammer".

Sherlock Frankenstein and the Legion of Evil
In October 2017, shortly after the cliffhanger ending of Black Hammer #13, Dark Horse Comics launched Sherlock Frankenstein and the Legion of Evil, the first Black Hammer spinoff miniseries, written by Jeff Lemire with art by David Rubín. The series focused on Lucy Weber, a young investigative reporter searching for the truth about what happened ten years ago when her father, the Black Hammer, disappeared. The miniseries introduced numerous characters that would go on to play larger roles in future stories, such as Cthu-Louise and Grimjim.

Doctor Star and the Kingdom of Lost Tomorrows (a.k.a. Doctor Andromeda and the Kingdom of Lost Tomorrows)
A second Black Hammer spinoff miniseries, Doctor Star and the Kingdom of Lost Tomorrows, written by Jeff Lemire with art by Max Fiumara was launched in December 2017. The series focuses on Doctor Star (later renamed Doctor Andromeda), a Golden Age superhero and contemporary of Abraham Slam.

The series was retitled "Doctor Andromeda and the Kingdom of Lost Tomorrows" following a legal issue with another publisher. As Lemire himself explained in a 2020 interview:

"I have been cagey about this because the honest truth is that there was a legal issue with the name and its similarity to another publisher's character and there is very little I can actually discuss. But we worked it out very amicably with that other publisher and we agreed to change his name and costume a bit. Not any drama or anything, it was all very civil. The good thing is the name changed, but the story is exactly the same. And that original printing of Doctor Star trades and floppies will probably be collector's items to a degree now, I guess.

This being Black Hammer, I do have a fun meta way of explaining the name change within the universe itself that will unfold next year in some new Black Hammer projects".

Doctor Andromeda originally appeared in a cameo role in the original Black Hammer series as an homage to Starman, specifically the incarnation written by James Robinson, to the point that the character's alter ego was named "Jimmy Robinson".

Black Hammer: Age of Doom
Black Hammer series ended and was relaunched as Black Hammer: Age of Doom in 2018. Lemire explained the name change in a press release:

"One thing Black Hammer has always done is comment on the history of superhero comics and we live in a world where superhero universes seem to be rebooted, relaunched, and rebirthed every year. It felt like we needed to play around with that idea, but put a Black Hammer spin on it".

Age of Doom finished the story that Lemire had originally pitched to Dark Horse about the superheroes stranded on Black Hammer farm. However, in a July 2019 interview, he explained this was simply the end of Phase I, and went on to tease developments for Phase II with more spinoffs and a new core Black Hammer series.

The Quantum Age
The Quantum Age, a spinoff set in 2141 (originally 3041, but this date was revised in the trade paperback) about a group of superheroes, inspired by the heroes of Black Hammer Farm, was released in March 2018. The series deals with some of the aftermath of Age of Doom.

Black Hammer ’45
Black Hammer ’45, a four-issue miniseries about the Black Hammer Squadron in World War II, was published in December 2018. This miniseries marked the first time a Black Hammer title wasn't solely written by Jeff Lemire, with Ray Fawkes joining as co-writer. Matt Kindt, who had previously worked on the Black Hammer: Giant-Sized Annual, returned as the artist.

Phase II

Skulldigger + Skeleton Boy
Just prior to SDCC 2019, Newsarama announced Skulldigger + Skeleton Boy, a six-issue miniseries about the vigilante Skulldigger, written by Jeff Lemire with art by Tonci Zonjic. The series had previously been mentioned in the Stranger Things / Black Hammer Free Comic Book Day 2019 issue and in The World of Black Hammer Encyclopedia. Jeff Lemire said that this book would be the first title in "Phase II" of the Black Hammer universe. Early on, Lemire had planned on drawing the series himself, but he couldn't find time in his schedule.

Colonel Weird: Cosmagog
Colonel Weird: Cosmagog, a four-issue miniseries was published in October 2020, written by Jeff Lemire with art by Tyler Crook. It looks at Colonel Randall Weird's past and his future beyond the ending of Black Hammer: Age of Doom. Lemire described the series as a bridge from the Phase I Black Hammer series to the stories he has planned for the future.

Barbalien: Red Planet
Barbalien: Red Planet, a five-issue miniseries written by Jeff Lemire and Tate Brombal with art by Gabriel Hernández Walta was announced in Spring 2020. The miniseries explores Mark Markz's time as a police officer during the 1980s AIDS crisis. It was originally scheduled to launch in LGBTQ Pride Month, but was delayed due to the COVID-19 pandemic.

Black Hammer: Visions
In November 2020, Dark Horse announced an eight-issue anthology series, with each story from different creative teams. Lemire has clarified that Visions is not in continuity.

Black Hammer: Reborn
This will be the core title of Phase II. It will be a twelve-issue series with a new artist, Caitlin Yarsky. Dean Ormston will continue to work in the World of Black Hammer on another title with more of a horror focus. The series jumps ahead twenty years after the finale of Black Hammer: Age of Doom with Lucy living in the suburbs with her partner and children. Lemire described it as "Lucy Weber's Mid-Life Crisis on Multiple Earths". It will focus on Lucy Weber as the new Black Hammer and include Skulldigger in a prominent role as well as many other returning characters.

The Unbelievable Unteens
Dark Horse announced a new spinoff reuniting Jeff Lemire and Tyler Crook, The Unbelievable Unteens in May 2021. This story is set to focus on comic artist Jane Ito meeting one of her comics creations. Earlier that year, Lemire had posted a teaser image by Crook featuring Jack Sabbath holding the fictional final issue of The Incredible Unteens.

The Last Days of Black Hammer
In March 2022, Lemire launched The Last Days of Black Hammer, a 110-page comic that was be serialized weekly through his Substack newsletter, Tales from the Farm. Drawn by Stefano Simeone, this story is a prequel to the original Black Hammer run, set in 1986 and focused on Joe Weber and his family.

Colonel Weird and Little Andromeda
Like The Last Days of Black Hammer, Colonel Weird and Little Andromeda was originally serialized through Jeff Lemire's Tales from the Farm newsletter. Written by Tate Brombal, the series has work from many artists. Ray Fawkes drew the framing sequences, while Tyler Bence, Shawn Kuruneru, Ariela Kristantina, Dani, Marguerite Sauvage, Andrea Sorrentino, Tyler Crook, Yuko Shimizu, and Nick Robles all drew self-contained stories within the framework. The series introduced the character Willow D. Whisper, created by Tate Brombal and Dani.

Phase III

Black Hammer: The End
Lemire indicated in September 2021 that he had begun work of the third and final phase of Black Hammer when he posted an image on Instagram teasing Black Hammer: The End. Shortly after Lemire announced that he had entered into an exclusive deal with Image Comics in January 2022, he posted a newsletter explaining what this would mean for Black Hammer - that the deal had an exemption for all his Black Hammer work. However, he also mentioned that he was planning to bring Black Hammer to an end in 2023.

Crossovers
Beginning in July 2019, Dark Horse Comics and DC Comics released Hammer of Justice, a five-issue Black Hammer and Justice League crossover miniseries, written by Jeff Lemire and drawn by Michael Walsh. In the initial announcement, Lemire assured readers he would keep Black Hammer character-driven and free of unnecessary tie-ins and events. "Hammer of Justice!" is not "a throwaway imaginary story" and will have lasting repercussions for future stories in continuity.

As to the topic of further crossovers in future, Lemire said: "If there is a very good story to be told, I am open to it, but I doubt we will see many, or any, other crossovers in the future. This particular opportunity really worked and was a great once in a lifetime chance to tell a really fun story". He has mentioned that artist Dean Ormston would like to do a Hellboy crossover if Mike Mignola was interested.

Future
In his email newsletter, Lemire has spoken about a few upcoming titles that have yet to be formally announced. Dean Ormston will be drawing a Madame Dragonfly miniseries. Following Black Hammer: Reborn, Lemire said he aimed to bring the series back to one core Black Hammer book for a while.

Lemire's Tales from the Farm newsletter will be the home for several new Black Hammer short stories with various creators.

Lemire has also mentioned he'd like to do a sequel to The Quantum Age called The Quantum World with artist Wilfredo Torres. He's also mentioned that he intends to come back to Black Hammer at some point after The End, when he's had a few years' break, to do a Golden Gail story.

Issues

Tales from the Farm online stories
In September 2021, Lemire launched a new iteration of his Tales from the Farm newsletter through Substack, a place where paying subscribers would have access to behind-the-scenes material and new stories. On January 31, 2022, he began the first of several planned World of Black Hammer projects.

Collected editions

Trade paperbacks

Hardcovers

Library editions

Awards

In other media
A film and television development was reported to be in development with Legendary Entertainment in November 2018. This deal included not just Black Hammer, but all its associated titles, effectively opening the door to create a cross-platform film and television shared universe. Both Jeff Lemire and Dean Ormston are executive producers, and Lemire will be actively involved in the adaptations. Lemire described his involvement as follows:

"I decided with Black Hammer, because it's so personal and near and dear to my heart, if I was ever going to option and develop it, I had to be intimately involved. As far as that adaptation, I do have to be the one that is creatively steering that ship, like the comic".

Lemire wrote a pilot script for the initial project with Legendary and a series bible, but in April 2021 Legendary Entertainment's option on the series was passed and Lemire was looking a new home for it.

References

2016 comics debuts
Dark Horse Comics titles
Superhero comics
2016 in comics
Comics by Jeff Lemire
Metafictional comics